|}

The Prix de Royaumont is a Group 3 flat horse race in France open to three-year-old thoroughbred fillies. It is run at Chantilly over a distance of 2,400 metres (about 1½ miles), and it is scheduled to take place each year in late May or early June.

History
The event is named after Royaumont Abbey, an abbey located 12 km from Chantilly. The race was established in 1883, and it was originally contested over 2,100 metres. It was initially reserved for fillies considered below the standard required for the Prix de Diane, which used to be run on the same day.

The Prix de Royaumont was abandoned throughout World War I, with no running from 1915 to 1918. The first two post-war editions were staged at Longchamp.

The race was cancelled once during World War II, in 1940. It was held at Longchamp in 1941 and 1942, and at Le Tremblay with a distance of 2,150 metres in 1943 and 1944. It was contested at Longchamp for the following three years, and it returned to Chantilly in 1948.

The Prix de Royaumont was not run in 1975 because of a strike by stable lads. A new schedule was introduced in 1978, and the race was moved to a date earlier than that of the Prix de Diane.

The event was staged at Longchamp from 1987 to 1990, and it was transferred to Saint-Cloud in 1991. Its distance was extended to 2,400 metres in 1992, and it continued to take place at Saint-Cloud until 1996. The race's only subsequent departure from Chantilly was in 2001, when it was run at Saint-Cloud.

The Prix de Royaumont is now held on the same day as the Prix du Jockey Club.

Records
Leading jockey (6 wins):
 Christophe Soumillon – Diasilixa (2003), Shawanda (2005), Sub Rose (2008), Kataniya (2015), Ebaiyra	(2020), Baiykara (2022)

Leading trainer (12 wins):
 André Fabre – Galla Placidia (1985), Villandry (1991), Berceau (1992), Apogee (1993), Genovefa (1995), Legend Maker (1997), Dance Routine (2002), Diasilixa (2003), Minatlya (2006), Legerete (2007), Savanne (2014), Pelligrina (2019)

Leading owner (7 wins):
 Jean Prat – Marjolaine (1893), Cabane (1908), Musique (1921), Raflade (1926), Sesia (1931), Relique (1933), Marphise (1938)

Winners since 1976

Earlier winners

 1883: Stresa
 1884: Geneve
 1885: Althea
 1886: Estelle
 1887: La Delivrande
 1888: Modena
 1889: Perle Rose
 1890: Fatuite
 1891: Amazone
 1892:
 1893: Marjolaine
 1894: Algarade
 1895: Phoebe
 1896: Ecrevisse
 1897: The Shrew
 1898: Goguette
 1899: Olympie
 1900: May Queen
 1901: Visitandine
 1902: Karamanie
 1903: Wide Awake
 1904: Zingara
 1905: Marie Galante
 1906: Blue Fly
 1907: La Neuville
 1908: Cabane
 1909: La Chandeleur
 1910: Basse Pointe
 1911: Allamanda
 1912: La Semillante
 1913: Coraline
 1914: Aurore Boreale
 1915–18: no race
 1919: Furlana
 1920: Chaine d'Or
 1921: Musique
 1922: Shocking
 1923: Pomare
 1924: Tetratela
 1925: Tagus
 1926: Raflade
 1927: Samphire
 1928: Likka
 1929: La Mie au Gue
 1930: L'Abbesse de Menin
 1931: Sesia
 1932: Fee Esterel
 1933: Relique
 1934: Brunanburh
 1935: Finlandaise
 1936: Cousine
 1937: Gandara
 1938: Marphise
 1939: Pereire
 1940: no race
 1941: Green Parrot
 1942: The Residency
 1943: Vertelle
 1944:
 1945: Theorie
 1946: Miss Foxlight
 1947: Picardie
 1948: Sans Toi / Seduction *
 1949: L'Oasis
 1950: Hortensia
 1951: Monrovia
 1952: Devinette
 1953: Deep Sea
 1954: Reine d'Atout
 1955: All Risk
 1956: Fast Jane
 1957: Ermeline
 1958: Magic Gold
 1959: Mi Carina
 1960: Marie Jolie
 1961: Belinda 111
 1962: Chaleureuse
 1963: Partisane
 1964: Dreida
 1965: Kere
 1966: Bubunia
 1967: Casaque Grise
 1968: Hugger Mugger
 1969: Agujita
 1970: Santa Tina
 1971: Pointilleuse
 1972: Decigale
 1973: Gay Style
 1974: Azurella
 1975: no race

* The 1948 race was a dead-heat and has joint winners.

See also
 List of French flat horse races

References
 France Galop / Racing Post:

 france-galop.com – A Brief History: Prix de Royaumont.
 galopp-sieger.de – Prix de Royaumont.
 horseracingintfed.com – International Federation of Horseracing Authorities – Prix de Royaumont (2016).
 pedigreequery.com – Prix de Royaumont – Chantilly.

Flat horse races for three-year-old fillies
Chantilly Racecourse
Horse races in France
Recurring sporting events established in 1883